Mariano "Tom" Ong (October 1938 – 14 December 2016) was a Filipino sports shooter.

Ong, born in October 1938 in Malabon, competed for the Philippines at the 1972 and 1976 Summer Olympics. He competed in the mixed 25m rapid fire pistol.

Ong owned the Malabon Soap and Oil Industrial Co., Inc. which operated the Spring Cooking Oil business. His son later took responsibility for the business' operations.

Ong died on 14 December 2016, of cardiac arrest following two hours of dialysis for his deteriorating kidneys. A diabetic, he frequently visited a hospital beginning in June 2016. He was survived by six children including Nathaniel Padilla. He was 78.

References

External links
 

1938 births
2016 deaths
People from Malabon
Filipino male sport shooters
Olympic shooters of the Philippines
Shooters at the 1972 Summer Olympics
Shooters at the 1976 Summer Olympics
20th-century Filipino people